Prakash Shrestha is a Nepali singer. He has recorded 1000 songs and released 12 albums in the form of cassettes and CDs. He has more than 500 performances nationally and internationally. He has lent his voice to playback songs in more than 150 Nepali films.

Early life 
Prakash Shrestha was born in Birgunj, Nepal. He graduated with a bachelor's degree in Commerce from Thakur Ram college (Birgunj) and went to pursue training in India where he obtained a diploma in music (Sangeet Prabhakar) from Allahabad University. Besides singing, he was also a sportsman of exceptional ability, excelling in table tennis, cricket and football. He started his career as a singer in 1973 (2030) and since then he has made tremendous contribution to Nepali music industry.

Career and achievements 

Prakash shrestha is renowned for his melodious songs such as Fewatal ko angan, Safal timro, Kanchi he Kanchi and Gahirai ma Dubdai na Duba. He is also the most recorded artist in Nepal film industry. Prakash has also been working with the Nepal airlines corporation for a long time.

Awards and honors 
He has been awarded with many prestigious awards and honors which includes:
 1979: 1st prize winner: 29th Birthday celebrations of Radio Nepal
 1989: Best singer award by Abhiyan
 1989: Consolation prize in ABU golden kite world song festival in Malaysia
 1991: Narayan Gopal Music award
 1993: Best Playback singer award in Sanmiguel film awards
 1994: Priya Award
 1995: National Vision Busy Award
 1996: Sayapatri Award
 1998: Nai Kalanidhi Award
 1999: Chhinnalata Award
 1999: Rastriya Gaurav Yuva Award
 1999: Mansarovar cine Award
 2000: Sikha Sur Award
 2000: Bhupal Man Karki Award
 2001: Nepal Film Artists National Association Award
 2001: Nepal Motion Picture Association Award
 1974: Subharajyavishek Padak
 1995: Prabal Gorkha Dakhsin Bahu from the late King Birendra.
 1996: Gaddi Arohan Rajat Mahotsa (Silver Jubilee medal) Padak
 2001: Birendra Aishwarya Sewa Padak
 2004: Prakhyat Trishakti Patta Padak by former King Gyanendra.

Prakash Shrestha has traveled far and wide both within and outside the country.

Concert 
Every concert, every tour and every recording session has had its share of stories to tell. The singer has performed in Osaka, Nagoya, Tokyo, Sydney, Melbourne, Canberra, Beijing, Shanghai, Hong Kong, Nanjing, Doha, Pyongyang, Seoul, Brunei, Dhaka, Kuala Lumpur, Bangkok, Singapore, Dubai, Sharjhah, Abu Dhabi, Karachi, Colombo, and many places in India including Delthi, Mumbai, Kolkata, varanasi, Sikkim, Mirik, Kalimpong and Darjeeling. He has sung in Moscow, Odessa, Moldavia and Terasport in Russia and also in London, Frankfurt, and Munich.

In 1999, along with Madan Krishna Shrestha, Haribansha Acharya, Kiran KC, Raja Ram Poudyal and dancer Saragna, Prakash went on two month stint doing shows all over America.

References

External links
 Facebook Profile Page – https://www.facebook.com/pages/Prakash-Shrestha/147856073195?v=info
 Nepalicollections.com Profile – https://web.archive.org/web/20110714163739/http://www.nepalicollections.com/artist.php?id=25

1957 births
Living people
20th-century Nepalese male singers
People from Birgunj